The M6 miniPlayer, from Meizu, is a flash-based portable media player that plays audio files in MP3, WMA, WAV, FLAC, APE and Ogg and is also capable of AVI video playback (using the XVID codec) on a 2.4-inch QVGA screen. The Mini Player includes an FM tuner, voice recorder, calendar, stopwatch, calculator, a basic ebook reader for TXT files, and two games.

Background 
The M6 is from Meizu's digital audio player productions.  Accordingly, it is only emerging in certain parts of the world including the United States, Australia, France, Russia and more.  Though the M6 supports many audio formats, the US release did not support MP3 format because of licensing issues. Apparently, there are workarounds to the issue with specific firmware upgrades.

Recently, Dane-Elec has formed a deal with Meizu to provide distribution of the M6.  Apparently, Dane-Elec has ironed out MP3 licensing issues. Many European models distributed by Dane‐Elec have their FM tuner disabled because of EU import duties; this can also be remedied by a firmware update. 

The M6 has been touted as an “iPod killer” because of its capabilities with respect to its aesthetics. One characteristic regarding the Meizu M6 is its ability to function without proprietary file formats and procedures.

Specifications 
The following are some of the more important specifications regarding the Meizu M6:

Software support

File transfer 
The M6 is connected to a computer via a USB 2.0 cable, upon which it is typically recognized as a mass storage device (starting with the 2.00x firmware series MTP is also supported).  Transferring media files and firmware upgrades is accomplished by simply dragging and dropping. Thus, no proprietary software is needed, allowing it to be a true cross-platform media player.  It is confirmed that the Linux 2.6 kernel driver for UMS devices works with the M6.

Video conversion 
For converting videos to the required Xvid format, Meizu provides a custom version of VirtualDub. There is also a Meizu profile available for another open source program, Iriverter and Batman Video Converter is available. Mac users can convert with MPEG Streamclip video converter.

Customization and variants
The miniPlayer allows the user to change a few display items such as the background image and font color.
Unofficially, it is possible to modify the RESOURCE.BIN file to skin the player with different icons. A number of stick‐on covers are available which allow the front surface and thumb pad to be colored.

Two versions of the miniPlayer were originally produced:
 The TP version has a Toshiba screen with better color reproduction at the cost of lower brightness. It is also 2 mm shallower. This model is no longer produced.
 The SP version has a brighter and slightly cheaper Samsung screen. This model is still in production.

The two versions have different firmware and the screen does not work if the wrong one is loaded. The RESOURCE.BIN files are the same, however.

There was also a special SP edition where the back metal plate would be black matte, instead of shiny metal.

M6SL and M6SE
A slimmer version of the miniPlayer, named Meizu M6SL (M6 “slim”), was released at the end of September 2007. The main difference from the original edition is the decreased thickness—7 mm (like the M3 Music Card) instead of 10 mm and new, better quality, Wolfson produced DACs.

See also
Meizu

References

External links 
European and United States Distributor Homepage

Portable media players
Audiovisual introductions in 2006